Ethmia hamaxastra is a moth in the family Depressariidae. It is found in South Africa.

The forewings are pale whitish-grey with seven small round dark fuscous or blackish spots ringed with white: two subcostal and median near the base, one towards the costa at one-fourth, one on the fold before this, and three representing the stigmata, the plical obliquely before the first discal. There is a marginal series of ten small irregular dark fuscous spots around the apical part of the costa and termen. The hindwings are pale whitish-yellowish, with the apical fourth suffused with pale grey.

References

Endemic moths of South Africa
Moths described in 1930
hamaxastra
Moths of Africa